Man Of Iron is a 1972 Hong Kong film by Shaw Studio. It was directed by Chang Cheh with Pao Hsueh Lieh.

Cast
Chen Kuan Tai
Cheng Li
Wong Chung
Zhu Mu
Tin Ching
Yeung Chi Hing
Bolo Yeung Tze
Lo Dik
Wong Ching
Tino Wong Cheung
Alexander Fu Sheng - as young man with a bicycle (extra)

References

1972 films
Hong Kong action films
1972 action films
1970s Mandarin-language films
Films directed by Chang Cheh
1970s Hong Kong films